Arcueil is a commune in the Val-de-Marne department in the southern suburbs of Paris, France.

Name 

The name Arcueil was recorded for the first time in 1119 as Arcoloï, and later in the 12th century as Arcoïalum, meaning "place of the arches" (Latin radical arcus, "arch", and Celtic suffix -ialo, "clearing, glade", "place of"), in reference to the Roman aqueduct carrying water to the Roman city of Lutetia (modern Paris).

History 

The arches of the Roman aqueduct crossed the Bièvre valley near Arcueil and are still visible at the Chateau des Arcs.

Between 1613 and 1624 a bridge-aqueduct over 1300 ft. long was constructed to convey water from the spring of Rungis, south of Arcueil, across the river Bièvre to the Luxembourg Palace in Paris. Between 1868 and 1872 another aqueduct, still longer, was superimposed above that of the 17th century, forming part of the system conveying water from the river Vanne to Paris.

The commune of Arcueil was officially renamed Arcueil-Cachan in 1894, after the hamlet of Cachan located within the commune. On 26 December 1922, Cachan seceded from the commune of Arcueil-Cachan and became a commune in its own right. The reduced commune of Arcueil-Cachan was renamed simply Arcueil.

Economy 
Orange France, formerly France Télécom S.A., has its headquarters in Arcueil.

Geography

Arcueil is served by two stations on Paris RER line B: Laplace and Arcueil-Cachan.

Education 
Primary schools:
 Five preschools: Henri Barbusse, Danielle Casanova, Jules Ferry, Olympe de Gouges, and Pauline Kergomard
 Five elementary schools: Henri Barbusse, Jules Ferry, Olympe de Gouges, Aimé Césaire, and Jean Macé

There is one junior high school, Collège Dulcie September and an engineering College, the École supérieure d'ingénieurs des travaux de la construction de Paris.

Residents are served by the Lycée intercommunal Darius-Milhaud in Le Kremlin-Bicêtre.

Personalities 
 Jean-Antoine de Baïf (1532–1589), member of the "Pléiade".
 Adrienne Bolland (1895–1975), first woman to fly an airplane across the Andes, was born in Arcueil.
 Claude Louis Berthollet (1748–1822), chemist.
 Michel Bulteau, writer and cult film maker, is a native of Arcueil.
 Pierre and Marie Curie installed at Arcueil an annex of the Institut du Radium for the chemical treatment of radioactive elements.
 Jean-Paul Gaultier, fashion designer.
 Pierre-Simon de Laplace (1749–1827), mathematician, astronomer and physicist.
 Henri Rousseau (1844–1910) also called "Douanier Rousseau", notable naive painter.
 The Marquis de Sade, writer and libertine.
 Erik Satie, composer, lived in Arcueil from 1898 to 1925.  He is buried in the town.
 Dulcie September, of the African National Congress, when living in France lodged in Arcueil; an Arcueil high school is named after her.

Population
Data before 1922 in the table and graph below refer to the old commune Arcueil(-Cachan), before the commune of Cachan was separated.

See also 
 Society of Arcueil
 Communes of the Val-de-Marne department
 :fr:Aqueducs d'Arcueil et de Cachan French Wiki article on the history of the 3 aqueducts

References

External links 
 Official website 
 Arcueil Business Theatre 

Communes of Val-de-Marne